Burcu Güneş (born 12 August 1975) is a Turkish singer.

Burcu Güneş, who is also known for her works on animal rights participated in a meeting with Prime Minister Recep Tayyip Erdoğan and animal rights activists in February 2011, and has also collaborated with HAYTAP on projects concerning animal rights.

Discography

Albums

Remix and compilation albums

Singles

Filmography

TV programs 
 2007 – Şarkı Söylemek Lazım 1 – Berke Hürcan's vocal coach (Show TV)
 2008 – Akademi Türkiye 2 – Guest judge (Kanal 1)
 2010 – Burcu Güneş ile Pop Caz Alaturka (TRT Müzik)
 2010 – Yok Böyle Dans 1 – Contestant (together with James Wilson) (Show TV)

References

External links

 Official website
 
 Burcu Güneş on Spotify

1975 births
Living people
Musicians from İzmir
Turkish singer-songwriters
Turkish pop singers
21st-century Turkish singers
21st-century Turkish women singers